Fusebox Funk is a powerhouse 6-piece Funk/Hip Hop phenomenon. Hailing from Jacksonville FL, Fusebox Funk have played for tens of thousands of fans at clubs and festivals across the country since their debut in 2001. Fusebox Funk can appeal to any type of audience by featuring a full horn section, three vocalists, and a rhythm section.

The group features a plethora of talent, including gold record artist J. Dash on keys and vocals.

History 
Originally formed in 2001 and originally funded by ex-drummer Pete Booras, the band self-produced their own CD demos, DVD videos and released their first CD, titled The Solution, in 2004. They also acted as their own agent and manager, booking gigs on their own until 2008.

After several years, the band went through a line-up change in 2007 adding Drummer Jeff Byrd (ByrDog), a Jazz/Fusion drummer with Hip-Hop roots, and Cary Jordan (Cary The Label Guy), a bassist with Jazz/Rock/Hip-Hop roots and a Warwick (bass guitar) user.

In 2008, rapper/celebrity chef J. Dash joined the Fusebox Funk lineup as a full-time keyboardist/ vocalist.

Fusebox Funk has appeared on the same bill with artists such as Galactic, Ozomatli and George Clinton, and has performed with the Jacksonville Symphony Orchestra.

Discography 
The Solution EP (2004)
The Next Obsession EP (2006)
Live and Limited (2009)
The Subterrestrials EP (2010)

External links 
Fusebox Funk's Official Website

References

Alternative hip hop groups
American funk musical groups
Southern hip hop groups
Musical groups from Jacksonville, Florida
2001 establishments in Florida
Musical groups established in 2001